The Graces were an American pop rock band in the late 1980s and early 1990s featuring Charlotte Caffey, Meredith Brooks, and Gia Ciambotti.

History 
Formed in 1987, they released their debut album Perfect View on A&M Records in 1989. Their first single "Lay Down Your Arms" hit No. 56 on the Billboard Hot 100 but the album and subsequent singles flopped. 

In 1991, they were dropped by the record label and Brooks left the band. She was replaced by Chrissy Shefts and the group continued to play live. They were about to be re-signed when Ciambotti was offered a job with the E Street Band, so the group disbanded in 1992 without recording a second album. Belinda Carlisle later covered "Lay Down Your Arms" on her 1993 album Real.

Discography

Albums
Perfect View (1989) US No. 147

Singles
"Lay Down Your Arms" (1989) US No. 56
"Perfect View" (1989)
"Time Waits for No One" (1989)
"50,000 Candles Burning" (1989)

References

External links

Musical groups from Los Angeles
American pop rock music groups
Rock music groups from California
1987 establishments in California
Musical groups established in 1987
Musical groups disestablished in 1992
A&M Records artists
American musical trios
All-female bands